A Nightmare on Elm Street 5: The Dream Child (stylized on-screen as A Nightmare on Elm Street: The Dream Child) is a 1989 American gothic slasher film directed by Stephen Hopkins and written by Leslie Bohem. It is the fifth installment in the A Nightmare on Elm Street franchise, and stars Lisa Wilcox, and Robert Englund as Freddy Krueger. The film follows Krueger, using a now pregnant Alice Johnson's baby's dreams to claim new victims.

The film's general tone is much darker than that of the previous films. A blue filter lighting technique is used in most of the scenes. It is one of the final slasher films released in the 1980s.

The Dream Child was released on August 11, 1989, and grossed $22.1 million on a budget of $8 million, a steep decline in box office receipts from Dream Warriors and The Dream Master, while still a box office success and the highest grossing slasher film of 1989. It received mostly negative reviews from critics.

The film was followed by Freddy's Dead: The Final Nightmare (1991).

Plot
In June 1989, a year after the previous film, Alice and Dan have started dating and there is no sign of Freddy Krueger. One day, while taking a shower after having sex with Dan, she has a vision of herself dressed in a nun's habit with a name-tag saying Amanda Krueger at a strange asylum. She is attacked by patients at the hospital but wakes up. The next day, Alice is graduating from high school alongside her new friends Greta, an aspiring but reluctant supermodel, Mark, a comic book fan, and Yvonne, a hospital volunteer and swimmer. Alice confides her nightmare to Dan, who tells her she is in control of her dreams.

On her way to work, Alice finds herself back at the asylum, where she sees Amanda giving birth to a gruesomely deformed baby. Amanda tries to collect the baby before it escapes but it sneaks out of the operating room. Alice follows the baby into the church where she defeated Freddy in the previous film. The baby finds Freddy's remains and quickly grows into an adult, hinting to Alice that he has found the key to coming back. Alarmed, she contacts Dan, who falls asleep en route to see her. Freddy attacks and electrocutes Dan, turning him into a frightful man/machine hybrid before veering him into oncoming traffic. Alice sees Dan's body come to life and taunt her before she faints. Waking in a hospital, she hears the news of Dan's death and that she is pregnant with his child. In the night, she is visited by a young boy named Jacob but the next day, Yvonne tells her there are no children on her floor, nor is there a children's ward.

Alice tells her friends about Freddy and his lineage; Yvonne refuses to listen but Mark and Greta are more supportive. That afternoon at a dinner party at her home, Greta falls asleep at the table. She dreams of herself snapping at her mother and ranting over her controlling nature before Freddy arrives and forces Greta to eat her own organs before choking her in front of a laughing audience. In the real world, Greta falls down dead in front of her mother and their guests. Yvonne and Alice visit Mark, who is grieving Greta's death, and a rift forms between them. Mark falls asleep and is nearly killed by Freddy but Alice saves him before seeing Jacob again. Jacob hints that Alice is his mother. Alice requests that Yvonne gets her an early ultrasound and discovers Freddy is using Jacob as a conduit to attack her friends even when she's awake and has been feeding him his victims to make him like himself.

Yvonne and Dan's parents still believe Alice is crazy. Dan's parents insist that she give them the baby when it is born, which Alice refuses. Alice and Mark research Krueger and the Nun Amanda. Realizing Amanda was trying to stop Freddy, they investigate her whereabouts and Alice goes to sleep, hoping to find Amanda at the asylum. While there, Freddy lures her away by threatening Yvonne, who has fallen asleep in a Jacuzzi. Alice rescues Yvonne who finally believes her. Mark falls asleep and is pulled into a comic book world, where Freddy turns him into a paper cutout and slashes him to pieces.

Alice goes to bed to find Freddy and saves her son. Realizing Freddy has been hiding in her every time she fell asleep she draws Freddy out from within herself. Yvonne finds Amanda's remains at the asylum and joins the fight in the dream world, encouraging Jacob to use the power Freddy had been giving him. Jacob destroys Freddy and his infant form is absorbed by his mother while Alice picks up a baby Jacob. Warning Alice away, Amanda seals Freddy away in time.

Several months later, Jacob Daniel Johnson is enjoying a picnic with his mother, grandfather, and Yvonne. Some children jumping rope nearby are humming Freddy's rhyme, hinting Freddy's return.

Cast

 Lisa Wilcox as Alice Johnson. Director Stephen Hopkins was keen for Wilcox to return as Alice, feeling that her story from the previous installment remained incomplete. Whilst Wilcox received top billing in the opening credits, her name was accidentally omitted from the end credits. The character of Alice is more assertive in this film compared to its predecessor and she eventually gives birth at the end of the film to her and Dan's child.
 Robert Englund as Freddy Krueger / Asylum Inmate (Freddy's biological father) in the asylum (without make-up)/Waiter (without make-up). Englund's makeup was refined again for this film by Howard Berger to make Freddy look older than in previous installments. 
 Kelly Jo Minter as Yvonne Miller. According to director Stephen Hopkins in the 2010 documentary Never Sleep Again, he cast Minter as she "rocked, she was a real firebrand". Minter enjoyed acting in the film but found her diving scenes near the end challenging as she was suffering from food poisoning at the time. Along with Alice, Yvonne survives at the film's conclusion.
 Erika Anderson as Greta Gibson. Greta's character is that of a model who is constantly having to watch her diet. Anderson's death scene, where she is force-fed by Krueger required the actress to undergo a lengthy makeup process and the final scene was severely cut down to comply with the MPAA.
 Danny Hassel as Dan Jordan. Along with Alice, Dan is the only other teenage survivor from the fourth film but is killed early on in The Dream Child. Hassel felt lucky that the producers had remembered him enough to ask him back for the sequel but, as with Erika Anderson, had to ensure a lengthy makeup process for his death scene which was also heavily edited down to comply with the MPAA. 
 Beatrice Boepple as Amanda Krueger. The character of Amanda Krueger, a nun who was raped at an asylum and later gave birth to Freddy, was previously played by Nan Martin in Nightmare on Elm Street 3: The Dream Warriors. Boepple plays a younger version of the same character but found the birth sequence difficult as she was on her period at the same time. 
 Whit Hertford as Jacob Johnson. Hertford was 11 years old when he was cast as Jacob, a future version of Alice's son. Hertford was already experienced acting in the horror genre having appeared in Poltergeist II and the revived Twilight Zone series. Despite this, as a minor, he wasn't permitted to utter the phrase "fuck you Krueger" as originally written in the script.
 Joe Seely as Mark Gray. Mark is a comic book fan, who has an unreciprocated crush on Greta. Seely recalled in 2010 that he wanted the character to look more gothic but was given dyed blonde hair and bright waistcoats in order to complement Erika Anderson better. For his death scene which takes place in a comic book world, Seely had to have extra makeup to appear brighter on screen. Mark's death was also heavily edited in accordance with MPAA guidelines. 
 Nicholas Mele as Dennis Johnson. Mele plays Alice's father, also returning from the previous film. According to Mele in an interview for the Never Sleep Again documentary, a death scene for his character had been shot for the previous film but omitted due to time constraints, thus meaning the producers could bring him back for this film. Alice's father in this film is a reformed alcoholic and more assertive in supporting his daughter when she discovers that she is pregnant.
 Burr DeBenning as Mr. Jordan. DeBenning was already known to the film's producers, having a played the role of Dr Serling in the episode "It's A Miserable" from the spinoff TV series Freddy's Nightmares. Mr Jordan wants Dan to pursue a football career and later threatens to have Alice sectioned in order to gain custody of her child once born.
 Clarence Felder as Mr. Gray
 George Rohlinger as George Rohlinger (extra)

Production
 A Nightmare on Elm Street 4: The Dream Master was released in 1988 and quickly became a financial success and the highest-grossing film in the Elm Street series up to that point. With the production of the TV spin-off Freddy's Nightmares taking place as well as a plethora of merchandise available, the profile of the franchise was at its highest point thus far.

Screenwriter Leslie Bohem, as interviewed in the 2010 documentary Never Sleep Again, originally pitched the basic storyline for The Dream Child to New Line executives during pre-production for Nightmare on Elm Street Part 3: The Dream Warriors. New Line executive Sara Risher was pregnant at the time and took exception to the idea of a newborn Freddy Krueger clawing his way out of a woman's womb. After giving birth, Risher herself started to think about the storyline and realised that the teenagers who had watched the original Elm Street film in 1984 were now starting to grow up and have their own families, prompting the development of The Dream Child in late 1988.

Pre-production on Part 5 was challenging primarily due to the frequently changing script. Director Stephen Hopkins recalled that the bulk of the final film came from Leslie Bohem's script, although John Skipp and Craig Spector also added material causing the Writers Guild of America to intervene when deciding who should ultimately be credited for the film. Bohem's original draft had Alice and her friends rehearsing a school performance of Medea and was, in his own words, "very weird". Director Hopkins was keen for the film to have more Gothic imagery than its predecessors, leading to inserted footage of towers, castles and a dungeon-like asylum.

The final editing on the film was challenging due to the demands made by the MPAA in order to reduce the onscreen violence, blood and gore. The most altered sequences were those for Dan and Greta which were edited down several times before the film could be theatrically released with an R rating in the USA (see deleted scenes below for more information on this).

Deleted scenes
Several scenes were removed from the film's final cut. The graduation sequence, which showed Alice's father giving her the camera, was significantly reduced. As a result, there are a number of minor continuity errors such as Alice holding airplane tickets moments before Dan gives them to her as a surprise gift.

Upon its release, the movie was subjected to some cuts in the sequences of Dan's, Mark's and Greta's deaths to avoid being classified X by MPAA due to their extremely violent and graphic nature. An unrated version of the film, which contained longer, more graphic versions of Dan's, Greta's and Mark's death scenes, was originally released on VHS and Laserdisc formats. In Dan's scene, cables can be seen sliding under the skin of Dan's arm, a large piece of the bike pierces his leg, and the skin on Dan's head is much more graphically torn off while he screams in pain. In Greta's scene, Freddy slices open a doll that begins to bleed and Greta is shown to have a gaping wound in her stomach, from which Freddy starts to feed to her. In Australia, the scenes were cut in cinemas, but restored to the VHS release. In Mark's death sequence, Freddy turns him into paper and shreds him before beheading him; the decapitation scene was deleted from the original version of the film. Despite this, the Australian Classification board did not rate it "R18+", giving it the lower "M15+" rating.  As of 2022, New Line Cinema  has yet to officially release the uncut version of the film on DVD or Blu-ray but excerpts of these scenes are found in the Nightmare 5 section of the documentary Never Sleep Again: The Elm Street Legacy.

Music

The soundtrack album consists of ten tracks. The first side consisted of heavy metal and hard rock songs, while the second consisted primarily of hip hop songs.

Track listing

Bruce Dickinson, lead singer of heavy metal band Iron Maiden, wrote and performed the song "Bring Your Daughter... to the Slaughter" for the film. A second version of the song recorded with Iron Maiden became the band's only Number 1 single in their native UK when released in December 1990.

Film score

Bonus tracks, previously unreleased (included on the A Nightmare On Elm Street - 8 CD Box Set)

Release

Home media
The film was released on VHS and Laserdisc on December 20, 1989.

Reception

Box office
A Nightmare on Elm Street 5: The Dream Child was released on August 11, 1989, in 1,902 theaters in North America. On the first weekend, the film opened $8.1 million, falling behind Parenthood ($9.7 million) and James Cameron's The Abyss ($9.3 million). The film ranked eighth at the second-weekend box office, with a revenue of $3.6 million, and it dropped out of the Top 10 list ranked at eleventh and fourteenth on the third and the fourth weekends, respectively. Overall, the film grossed $22.1 million at U.S. box office.

The film is the highest grossing slasher film released in 1989. It is currently the second-lowest-grossing Nightmare on Elm Street film. The film ranked number forty-three of the Top fifty highest-grossing films released in the U.S. in 1989 and is thirty-seventh of all slasher films cataloged by Box Office Mojo.

Critical response

The review aggregator website Rotten Tomatoes reports a 30% approval rating and an average rating of 4.12/10 based on 33 reviews. The site's consensus is: "A Nightmare on Elm Street feels exhausted by this cheesy fifth entry, bogged down by a convoluted mythology while showing none of the chilling technique that kicked off the franchise." On Metacritic the film has a weighted average score of 54 out of 100, based on 11 critics, indicating "mixed or average reviews".

Caryn James of The New York Times wrote that the film "doesn't pretend to be anything more than it is – a genre film that won't totally insult your intelligence or your eyes". Variety called it "a poorly constructed special effects showcase" with "highly variable" acting, but praised the special effects, stating that "saving grace is the series of spectacular special effects set pieces featuring fanciful makeup, mattes, stopmotion animation and opticals". Dave Kehr of the Chicago Tribune praised the direction of Director Stephen Hopkins, stating, "Using a style heavily indebted to music videos - lots of fast cutting, odd angles and gratuitous camera movements - Hopkins keeps the energy level up, though his manner is a bit too choppy to keep all of the diverse elements together." Kevin Thomas of the Los Angeles Times described it as "a dynamic, fully visually realized experience", complimenting the acting, set design, and directing. Thomas identifies Krueger as representing the irrational adult world to teenagers. Richard Harrington of The Washington Post ranked it below the first and third films, saying the plot is too confusing.

In a 2016 interview with Den of Geek, Robert Englund recollects the experience working with director Stephen Hopkins, "I met Stephen Hopkins, who's like the handsomest man in Hollywood, at a Thai restaurant in Culver City. Stephen was doing storyboards and he's such a great illustrator that I just said, 'Take me now.' He goes, 'I want this whole sequence to be like M.C. Escher.' I went oh, perfect for a dream sequence, I get it. That's all he had to say to me and show me his doodle on a napkin, and I was hooked." In the same interview, he also praised the special effects and experience when shooting the film,  "My best time on that was the sequence in the insane asylum. That was fun because that was my first time with the floating crane camera. There's no crew. It was just me and 100 extras, and this little teeny camera. It was like having a drone on a little wiry crane ... and there's a lot of wide shots in that magnificent set."

In a 1990 interview promoting the film Predator 2, Director Stephen Hopkins has expressed disappointment with the final product, stating that "It was a rushed schedule without a reasonable budget and after I finished it, New Line and the MPAA came in and cut the guts out of it completely. What started out as an OK film with a few good bits turned into a total embarrassment. I can't even watch it anymore."

Accolades
1990 Fantasporto Awards
 Critics Award – Stephen Hopkins (Won)
 International Fantasy Film Award Best Film – Stephen Hopkins (Nomination)
 
10th Golden Raspberry Awards
 Razzie Award for Worst Original Song – Bruce Dickinson for "Bring Your Daughter... to the Slaughter" (Won)
 Razzie Award for Worst Original Song – Kool Moe Dee for "Let's Go" (Nominated)

1990 Young Artist Awards
 Best Young Actor in a Supporting Role – Whit Hertford (Won)

See also
List of ghost films

References

External links

 
 
 
 
 
 

1989 films
1989 horror films
Nightmare Elm Street 5
American teen horror films
American sequel films
1980s English-language films
American slasher films
Films about child abuse
Films about nightmares
Films set in the 1940s
Films set in 1989
Films set in Ohio
Golden Raspberry Award winning films
Insomnia in film
Matricide in fiction
A Nightmare on Elm Street (franchise) films
Adaptations of works by Wes Craven
Teenage pregnancy in film
Films directed by Stephen Hopkins
American pregnancy films
New Line Cinema films
1980s pregnancy films
1980s American films